Nizina River is the largest tributary of the Chitina River in the U.S. state of Alaska. It is located in the Wrangell–St. Elias National Park and Preserve.

Geography
At low water, it follows one or more constantly shifting channels. At medium stage, the number of channels increases, and finally at flood height, the entire flood plain becomes covered from bank to bank with swift-flowing, muddy water carrying large quantities of sand and gravel. Below Young Creek the bordering mountains are separated by a wider valley in which the river has cut a deep trench through the gravel and shale formations. Finally, for the last  of its course, the river flows between walls of solid rock, forming a box canyon for much of the distance.

Tributaries

They flow past important gold placer claims. The basin of Dan Creek comprises  and that of Chititu Creek .

Its lower course parallels that of Chititu Creek, about which its headwaters turn, interlocking with those of Dan Creek. Neither Dan, Chititu, nor Young creek receives much, if any, glacial water. They carry large quantities of silt from the shale formation in which they have cut their channels, besides much gravel and sand from the overlying formation.

It is subject to extreme floods, usually one or more each year, which are caused by the clogging of the subglacial channels that open up with an immense flow after enough water has accumulated to produce sufficient pressure to force out the obstruction. The flood discharge sometimes lasts several days.

McCarthy Creek then gradually bends toward the west, and for the last  flows about northwest. The basin comprises . Below the East Fork the stream flows between high gravel banks, meeting here and there ledges of shale and porphyry through which it has cut its way, forming small canyons.

History
Placers were discovered in 1902. The Nizina placer district embraces in a general sense the drainage areas of Dan, Chititu, and Young creeks, which flow into Nizina River from the east and south.

See also
 List of rivers of Alaska

References

Rivers of Alaska
Rivers of Copper River Census Area, Alaska
Rivers of Unorganized Borough, Alaska